Kuo Tai-chih (born 26 December 1973) is a Taiwanese weightlifter. He competed in the men's light heavyweight event at the 1996 Summer Olympics.

References

1973 births
Living people
Taiwanese male weightlifters
Olympic weightlifters of Taiwan
Weightlifters at the 1996 Summer Olympics
Place of birth missing (living people)